Allotinus parapus is a butterfly in the family Lycaenidae. It was described by Hans Fruhstorfer in 1913. It is found on Mount Kinabalu in Borneo.

References

Butterflies described in 1913
Allotinus
Butterflies of Borneo